Elections for Oxford City Council were held on Thursday 4 May 2006. As Oxford City Council is elected by halves, one seat in each of the 24 wards was up for election. The exception was St Clement's, where both seats were up for election as a by-election for the other seat was held on the same day. Therefore, 25 of the 48 seats on the Council were up for election. Overall turnout was 35.8%, down from 37.6% in 2004. The lowest turnout (24.9%) was in Carfax ward and the highest (49.6%) in Marston.

Results 

Note: two Independents stood in 2006, compared with three in 2004.

The total number of seats on the Council after the election was:
Liberal Democrats - 19 (39.6%)
Labour - 17 (35.4%)
Green - 8 (16.7%)
Independent Working Class Association - 4 (8.3%)

Nomination form controversy
The Oxford University Conservative Association president-elect Charlie Steel was the Conservative candidate in the Holywell ward. His candidacy was embroiled in controversy in late April when some of his nominators alleged that they had not signed his nomination forms, meaning their signatures had been forged. A Police investigation was launched and Steel did not resign from his OUCA position.

The full list of Steel's supposed nominators were a selection of students of the University of Oxford, some of whom were officers of the Oxford University Conservative Association (OUCA). A number of those officers subsequently complained to Oxford City Council that they had not signed the papers.

Results by ward

Barton and Sandhills

Blackbird Leys

Carfax

Churchill

Cowley

Cowley Marsh

Headington

Headington Hill and Northway

Hinksey Park

Holywell

Iffley Fields

Jericho and Osney

Littlemore

Lye Valley

Marston

North

Northfield Brook

Quarry and Risinghurst

Rose Hill and Iffley

St Clement's 

Because both seats were up for election each voter had two votes (i.e. plurality-at-large voting). Turnout has been estimated by halving the number of votes cast.

St Margaret's

St Mary's

Summertown

Wolvercote

Party Share of Vote Maps

References

Statement of Persons Nominated, from Oxford City Council

2006
2006 English local elections
2000s in Oxford